In theoretical physics, a minimal model or Virasoro minimal model is a two-dimensional conformal field theory whose spectrum is built from finitely many irreducible representations of the Virasoro algebra.
Minimal models have been classified and solved, and found to obey an ADE classification.
The term minimal model can also refer to a rational CFT based on an algebra that is larger than the Virasoro algebra, such as a W-algebra.

Relevant representations of the Virasoro algebra

Representations

In minimal models, the central charge of the Virasoro algebra takes values of the type

where  are coprime integers such that .
Then the conformal dimensions of degenerate representations are 

and they obey the identities

The spectrums of minimal models are made of irreducible, degenerate lowest-weight representations of the Virasoro algebra, whose conformal dimensions are of the type  with 

Such a representation  is a coset of a Verma module by its infinitely many nontrivial submodules. It is unitary if and only if . At a given central charge, there are  distinct representations of this type. The set of these representations, or of their conformal dimensions, is called the Kac table with parameters . The Kac table is usually drawn as a rectangle of size , where each representation appears twice
due to the relation

Fusion rules

The fusion rules of the multiply degenerate representations  encode constraints from all their null vectors. They can therefore be deduced from the fusion rules of simply degenerate representations, which encode constraints from individual null vectors. Explicitly, the fusion rules are

where the sums run by increments of two.

Classification

A-series minimal models: the diagonal case 

For any coprime integers  such that , there exists a diagonal minimal model whose spectrum contains one copy of each distinct representation in the Kac table:

The  and  models are the same.

The OPE of two fields involves all the fields that are allowed by the fusion rules of the corresponding representations.

D-series minimal models 

Using the symmetry 
we assume that  is even, then  is odd. The spectrum is

where the sums over  run by increments of two.
In any given spectrum, each representation has multiplicity one, except the representations of the type  if , which have multiplicity two. These representations indeed appear in both terms in our formula for the spectrum.

The OPE of two fields involves all the fields that are allowed by the fusion rules of the corresponding representations, and that respect the conservation of diagonality: the OPE of one diagonal and one non-diagonal field yields only non-diagonal fields, and the OPE of two fields of the same type yields only diagonal fields. 

For this rule, one copy of the representation 
counts as diagonal, and the other copy as non-diagonal.

E-series minimal models 

There are three series of E-series minimal models. (This actually implies .) Using the notation , the spectrums read:

Examples 

The following A-series minimal models are related to well-known physical systems:
  : trivial CFT,
  : Yang-Lee edge singularity,
  : critical Ising model,
  : tricritical Ising model,
  : tetracritical Ising model.
The following D-series minimal models are related to well-known physical systems:
  : 3-state  Potts model at criticality,
  : tricritical 3-state Potts model.
 

Related conformal field theories

Coset realizations

The A-series minimal model with indices  coincides with the following coset of WZW models:
 
Assuming , the level  is integer if and only if  i.e. if and only if the minimal model is unitary. 

There exist other realizations of certain minimal models, diagonal or not, as cosets of WZW models, not necessarily based on the group .

Generalized minimal models

For any central charge , there is a diagonal CFT whose spectrum is made of all degenerate representations,

This means in particular that the degenerate representations that are not in the Kac table decouple.

Liouville theory

Moreover, A-series minimal models have a well-defined limit as : a diagonal CFT with a continuous spectrum called Runkel–Watts theory, which coincides with the limit of Liouville theory when .

Products of minimal models

There are three cases of minimal models that are products of two minimal models.
At the level of their spectrums, the relations are:

Fermionic extensions of minimal models

If , the A-series and the D-series  minimal models each have a fermionic extension. These two fermionic extensions involve fields with half-integer spins, and they are related to one another by a parity-shift operation.

References

Conformal field theory
Exactly solvable models